Márcio Luís Lyra Coelho (born 8 June 1978) is a Brazilian football manager. He was also a futsal player, and played as a winger.

Career
Born in Araranguá, Santa Catarina, he was known as Gugu during his playing days. A futsal winger, he represented Grêmio Esportivo América, Universidade do Sul de Santa Catarina (Florianópolis), Associação Desportiva Colegial and Centro Esportivo Cabo Frio in his home country, aside from two years in Spain with Ibi FS.

In 2011, Coelho started working as a manager with Figueirense's youth setup. On 13 February 2017, he was appointed assistant manager of the main squad, acting as an interim manager for two occasions during the year.

In July 2019, after the club was in a severe financial crisis and threatened with relegation in the Série B, Coelho replaced sacked Vinícius Eutrópio as manager, in an interim manner. After the appointment of Pintado in October, he returned to his previous role, but on 11 December, he was named permanent manager of the club for the ensuing season.

On 27 August 2020, Coelho was sacked by Figueira. On 6 January of the following year, he replaced Gilmar Dal Pozzo at the helm of Paraná also in the second division.

References

External links

1978 births
Living people
Sportspeople from Santa Catarina (state)
Brazilian men's futsal players
Brazilian expatriate sportspeople in Spain
Brazilian football managers
Campeonato Brasileiro Série B managers
Figueirense FC managers
Paraná Clube managers